Return of the Mack is the debut studio album by English singer-songwriter Mark Morrison. It was first released through his Mack Life Records imprint in the United Kingdom and then released by Atlantic Records in the United States, with distribution via Warner Music Group on April 22, 1996. The album includes a well-known popular song "Return of the Mack", which stayed for a remarkable 41 weeks on the US Billboard charts. Upon its release, Return of the Mack received mixed reviews from music critics, who praised Morrison's strong voice and entertaining songs, but described the album as having weak production. The album stayed for 38 weeks on the UK Albums Chart, where it debuted and peaked at number 4, and became a certified platinum by British Phonographic Industry (BPI). On the US Billboard 200, the album reached a peak of a number 76. The album has since sold over three million copies worldwide.

The album made Morrison the first artist in British pop history to have five top ten singles from a debut album to chart on the UK Singles Chart. These singles included "Let's Get Down", "Return of the Mack", "Crazy (Remix)", "Trippin'", "Horny" and "Moan and Groan". The first single "Crazy" became a top twenty hit in the United Kingdom, a remix was also released, which peaked at number 6 in the United Kingdom. The single, "Return of the Mack" has become an international hit for spending two weeks at number one on the UK Singles Chart, and one week at number 2 on the US Billboard Hot 100. The song was listed at number 8 on the Billboard 200 year-end chart for 1997 and was certified platinum by the Recording Industry Association of America (RIAA). Morrison became the first black male solo artist to reach number one on the UK Singles Chart in the 1990s. In 1997, he received four Brit Awards nominations, a Mercury Prize nomination, a MTV's Europe Music Awards nomination, and five Music of Black Origin Awards (MOBO) nominations. He would win the Best R&B song in the 1996's MOBO Awards for "Return of the Mack".

Background 
The album was released on  through his own record label, Mack Life Records. The album was largely self-produced by Morrison, and was recorded over a two-year period. The album's release was preceded by the release of three singles.

Release and promotion 
At the 1997 BRIT Awards held on 24 February 1997, he performed "Return of the Mack".

Singles 

The debut song "Crazy" became a top 20 hit in the UK. It was later featured in the 1997 film Speed 2: Cruise Control and appeared on the film's soundtrack album. The second single was "Let's Get Down".

Critical reception 

Return of the Mack received mixed reviews from music critics. Entertainment Weekly writer Matt Diehl wrote "its title, "Return of the Mack" sounds like another rap tale of gangsta paradise; instead, Mark Morrison comes off more like a funked-up Seal, promising revenge to a deceitful lover in a warbly croon." He goes onto add, "the end result is an odd but infectious new-jack-swing variation on Hey Joe, buoyed by bubbly beats and the insistent title refrain."

Track listing

Charts

Weekly charts

Year-end charts

Certifications

Release history

References 

1996 debut albums
Mark Morrison albums